The Light Cinemas (stylised as the light) is a British independent cinema chain.

The Light was founded in 2007 by ex-Cineworld director Keith Pullinger and John Sullivan, a former director at Warner Village Cinemas. The oldest cinema in the chain is currently New Brighton, which opened in December 2011.

The cinema chain offers mainstream and independent films in a premium environment, with standard cinema ticket prices. All their Cinemas are fully licensed and include a café bar offer. The Light offers Infinity cards, which allow subscribers to view films for a flat monthly fee.

Locations

Future locations
 Huddersfield - 9 Screens - Opening 2023
 Redhill, Surrey - 6 screens - Opening 2023
 Colchester - Expected completion 2024

References

Cinema chains in the United Kingdom
British companies established in 2007
Companies based in London